Sema or SEMA may refer to:

People
 Sema (tribe), an Indian Naga tribe

Given name
 Sema Apak (born 1985), Turkish female sprinter
 Arzu Sema Canbul (born 1973), Turkish female footballer

 Surname
 Ken Sema (born 1993), Swedish footballer for English Premier League side Watford F.C.
 Maic Sema (born 1988), Swedish footballer for GIF Sundsvall

Places
 The ICAO airport code for José María Velasco Ibarra Airport in Macará, Ecuador

Organizations
 Sema Group, an Anglo-French IT services company
 SEMA, Specialty Equipment Market Association
 Seoul Museum of Arts, a museum located in Seoul, South Korea
Storage Equipment Manufacturers Association, a professional association of storage equipment manufacturers in the United Kingdom

Religion
 Sema, a Sufi ritual
 Bai Sema or Sema stone, boundary stones surrounding the ordination halls of Buddhist temples in Thailand

Biology
 The seema or the masu salmon (Oncorhynchus masou), a species of fish
 Sema domain, a protein domain

See also
 SEMATECH (Semiconductor Manufacturing Technology Consortium)

 Cima (disambiguation)
 Sima (disambiguation)
 Seema (disambiguation)